Fate is a U.S. magazine about paranormal phenomena. Fate was co-founded in 1948 by Raymond A. Palmer (editor of Amazing Stories) and Curtis Fuller. Fate magazine is the longest-running magazine devoted to the paranormal.  Promoted as "the world's leading magazine of the paranormal", it has published expert opinions and personal experiences relating to UFOs, psychic abilities, ghosts and hauntings, cryptozoology, alternative medicine, divination methods, belief in the survival of personality after death, Fortean phenomena, predictive dreams, mental telepathy, archaeology, warnings of death, and other paranormal topics.

Though Fate is aimed at a popular audience and tends to emphasize personal anecdotes about the paranormal, American writer and frequent Fate contributor Jerome Clark says the magazine features a substantial amount of serious research and investigation, and occasional debunking of dubious claims. Subjects of such debunking articles have included Atlantis, the Bermuda Triangle, and the Amityville Horror.

History

Established in 1948 by Clark Publishing Company, the first edition of Fate hit world newsstands in the spring. Co-founded by Ray Palmer, editor of the Amazing Stories magazine, and Curtis Fuller, an accomplished editor in his own right, the magazine's inaugural edition featured an article by Kenneth Arnold who recounted in it his UFO encounter in 1947. Arnold's sighting marked the beginning of the modern UFO era, and his story propelled the magazine to national recognition. The headquarters is in Lakeville, Minnesota.

In 1953, Curtis Fuller and his wife Mary took full control of Fate when Palmer sold his interest in the venture. The Fullers expanded the magazine's focus, and increased readership to well over 100,000 subscribers.

In 1988, Fate was sold to Llewellyn Publications (now Llewellyn Worldwide). In his farewell column, Curtis Fuller wrote, "Our purpose throughout this long time has been to explore and to report honestly the strangest facts of this strange world and the ones that don't fit into the general beliefs of the way things are."

Fate underwent a facelift in 1994, when Llewellyn decided to change it from digest size to a full-size, full-color magazine.

In 1998, the magazine celebrated its 50th year of publication. When asked to comment on how a magazine like Fate survived through five decades, Carl Llewellyn Weschcke said, "No product, especially a magazine, can stay around for fifty years unless it meets a need. Fate recognizes that the impossible can be possible; we explore the unknown so that it can be known."

In September 2001, Galde Press, Inc., owned by editor-in-chief Phyllis Galde, purchased Fate. Galde has continued Fate's reporting of unusual events and active reader involvement in shaping the content of the magazine.

In May 2003, Fate returned to its pre-1994 digest size. In 2008, it moved to a bi-monthly format with its July/August issue. True to its origins, in many issues Fate magazine continues the tradition of having retro looking art appear on the cover.

Further reading
 "Strange Fate" Compiled by the Editors of Fate Magazine, with an Introduction by Frank Edwards. Paperback Library. 1965.
"Strange Twist of Fate" Compiled by the Editors of Fate Magazine. Paperback Library. 1967.
 "Exploring the Healing Miracle" Compiled by the Editors of Fate Magazine. Clark. 1983.
 "Out of Time and Place" Compiled & Edited by Terry O'Neill from the files of Fate Magazine. Llewellyn Publications. 1999. 
 "Mysteries and Monsters of the Sea" Compiled by the Editors of Fate Magazine. Gramercy. 2001. 
 "Mysteries of the deep" Compiled & Edited by Frank Spaeth from the files of Fate Magazine. Bounty Books, 2005. 
 "Strange But True—From the Files of Fate Magazine" By: Corrine Kenner, Craig Miller. September 2002. 
 "True Tales of Ghostly Encounters" By: Andrew Honigman. September 2006.

References

External links
 Official website
 OCLC Worldcat page for library holdings of Fate

Bimonthly magazines published in the United States
Magazines established in 1948
Magazines published in Minnesota
Paranormal magazines